Kevin R. E. McCormick FRSA (born 1965) is the eighth President and Vice-Chancellor of Huntington University, located in Greater Sudbury, Ontario, Canada. He served as Honorary Lieutenant-Colonel of the 2nd Battalion, Irish Regiment of Canada from 2011-2017.  He was appointed Honorary Colonel of the Irish Regiment of Canada in December 2017.

Early life and education 
Born in Toronto, Ontario, McCormick studied sociology at York University, graduating with a Bachelor of Arts (Hons) degree in 1990 and a master's degree in 1992. McCormick went on to complete his PhD in Sociology, supervised Livy A. Visano, and focused his research on penology.

Career 
McCormick was a Fellow of Bethune College. and an instructor in the Sociology Department at York University. In 1997, he joined Georgian College as Dean of the Institute of University Partnerships and Advanced Studies, where McCormick was responsible for establishing undergraduate and graduate programming. This resulted in the creation of the Police Studies and Automotive Management degree programs, and the Cyberspace Security post-graduate program. In 2006, McCormick joined Huntington University as President and Vice-Chancellor, where he continues to preside today. At Huntington University, he has overseen the establishment of the several centres of excellence including the Lougheed Teaching and Learning Centre, the Canadian Institute for Studies in Aging, the Canadian Institute for International Policing and the Canadian Finnish Institute. In 2019, Dr. McCormick as appointed as a Governor in Council for the National Seniors Council.

Volunteerism and affiliations 
As a volunteer, McCormick has dedicated his time to over fifty community and charity committees at a local, national, and international level.

In 2012, Dr. McCormick led the United Way campaign for Sudbury and Nipissing districts and helped raise close to $2 million for 52 community-based programs.

List of volunteer initiatives 
 Big Brothers Big Sisters
 Health Sciences North
 Learning Disabilities Association
 Lifeline Sudbury
 Maison Vale Hospice
 Military Families Fund(s)
 Northern Ontario Centre for Learning Disabilities (NOCLD)
 Reseau AIDS Network
 St. John's Ambulance
 Sudbury Theatre Centre
 United Way
 Various refugee organizations
 Veterans’ Associations
 Various refugee organizations

Military 
In 2011, the Minister of National Defence, Peter MacKay, named McCormick the Honorary Lieutenant-Colonel of the Irish Regiment of Canada. He served in the role until December 2017, when he was appointed Honorary Colonel of the Irish Regiment of Canada.

McCormick founded Project Honour and Preserve, a program that seeks to raise awareness of the sacrifices and contributions made by Canadian Veterans. As part of this program, McCormick finds lost items belonging to Veterans and repatriates them with their owners or families of the Veterans, at his own expense. In 2014, he travelled across Canada to present items to various museums and veterans associations. He expanded the program in 2016 to include items from the United States and the United Kingdom.

McCormick established the Canadian Homeless Veterans’ Network, where he supports veterans through donations to shelters and service industries. In addition, he has used his own funds to create bursaries and scholarships to benefit members of the Canadian military and their families, and worked with the Canadian Armed Forces to create educational programs.

In 2016, McCormick received a National Commendation by the Minister of Veterans Affairs.

And as Honorary Colonel, in 2018, McCormick represented the Irish Regiment of Canada attending the Prince of Wale’s 70th Birthday Patronage Celebration.

Refugee work 
Internationally, McCormick has volunteered in Myanmar, Thailand, India, Sri Lanka, Laos, Cambodia, Pakistan, and Morocco to support developmental and relief efforts. He has visited refugee camps, and purchased medical supplies, educational resources, and other supplies to help those in need.

Awards and honours 
McCormick has received many awards for community service, volunteerism, education, and humanitarianism.

He received the Award of Excellence for Humanitarianism by Chiangrai Rajabhat University in 2008.

In 2010, McCormick was named as a Member of the Order of the Crown of Thailand by the Kingdom of Thailand. And in 2019, was elevated to the Member (Fifth Class) of the Most Exalted Order of the White Elephant. 

In the 2010, McCormick also named a Member of the Venerable Order of St. John, awarded by The Right Honourable David Johnston.

In recognition of his public service, McCormick was awarded the Queen's Diamond Jubilee Medal in 2012, as well as the Queen's Golden Jubilee Medal in 2002.

McCormick received the Community Builders’ Award of Excellence for Education from Laurentian Media in 2012.

In 2015, McCormick was awarded the International Human Rights Award by the Vitanova Foundation and the International Peace Medal by the YMCA.

In 2016, McCormick was the recipient of Paul Harris Fellowship, presented by the Sunrisers and Rotary Club of Sudbury.

In 2017, McCormick was named a recipient of the Senate of Canada 150 Medal and a Knight, First Class, of the Order of the White Rose of Finland.

In 2018, McCormick was named Fellow, Community Shift by KPMG Enterprise and Ivey Business School.

List of Awards 

1996 
 University-Wide Teaching Excellence Award from York University
 Academic Advising Award from the Sociology Undergraduate Students’ Association and Department of Sociology at York University 
1999 
 Canadian Professor of the Year Award from the Canadian Council for Advancement of Education and Council for Advancement and Support of Education 
2001 
 Award for Innovative Excellence in Teaching, Learning and Technology from the International Conference on Teaching and Technology
2002 
 Queen's Golden Jubilee Medal
2003 
 International Award of Merit from the Pontzen International Academy of Art
2005 
 Exemplary Leadership Award from the International Chairs Academy
2008 
 Award of Excellence for Humanitarianism from Chiangrai Rajabhat University 
2010 
 Member of the Order of the Crown of Thailand by the Kingdom of Thailand 
 Member of the Venerable Order of St. John 
2012 
 Queen's Diamond Jubilee Medal 
2015 
 International Human Rights Award from the Vitanova Foundation
 International Peace Medal from the YMCA
2016 
 Paul Harris Fellowship from the Sunrisers and Rotary Club of Sudbury
2017 
Senate of Canada 150 Medal 
Knight, First Class, of the Order of the White Rose of Finland

2018 
Greater Sudbury Chamber of Commerce Bell Business Excellence Award - Executive of the Year

Canadian Finnish Institute (CFI) 
On October 8, 2015, Huntington University launched the Canadian Finnish Institute, to highlight the relationship between Finnish peoples and Canada. The centre is unique for Canada, and serves many different functions: 
 to acknowledge and honour the contributions of Finnish people to Canada, 
 to establish partnerships with Finnish centres of learning, and 
 to celebrate Finnish-Canadian community endeavours. 
In honour of former Finnish Ambassador to Canada, Charles Murto, CFI established a scholarship to award students who help foster Finnish-Canadian liaisons. Some of the CFI fellows include Judy Erola and Charles Murto.

Affiliations 
Huntington University no longer offers any degree programs as of the dissolution of its federated partnership with Laurentian University in 2021. Huntington University had partnership agreements with colleges and universities in Canada and overseas. In the past,  the Gerontology department had established articulation agreements with Cambrian College, Canadore College, Fanshawe College, George Brown College, Georgian College, Sault College and St. Lawrence College. Huntington's Communications Studies department had an articulation agreement with Cambrian College concerning their Public Relations Program.

Published works 
McCormick, K. R., & Visano, L. A. (1992). Canadian penology: Advanced perspectives and research. Toronto: Canadian Scholars' Press.

References 

1965 births
Canadian educators
Living people
People from Toronto
York University alumni